Deepak Ravindran is a technology entrepreneur, dropout and the cofounder and CEO of Innoz Technologies, LookUp and Pirate Fund. Ravindran founded Innoz, a wireless communications platform, with five friends in college in India. In 2011, he started SMSGyan, an SMS-based system, in India. Ravindran was recognized on MIT Technology Review's Innovators Under 35.

References

Living people
Year of birth missing (living people)